Anita Márton (born 15 January 1989) is a Hungarian shot putter.

International competitions

Awards
Hungarian athlete of the Year (3): 2014, 2015, 2016
  Cross of Merit of Hungary – Golden Cross (2004)

External links
 
 
 
 
 
 

1989 births
Living people
Hungarian female shot putters
Sportspeople from Szeged
Olympic athletes of Hungary
Olympic bronze medalists for Hungary
Olympic bronze medalists in athletics (track and field)
Athletes (track and field) at the 2012 Summer Olympics
Athletes (track and field) at the 2016 Summer Olympics
Athletes (track and field) at the 2020 Summer Olympics
Medalists at the 2016 Summer Olympics
World Athletics Championships athletes for Hungary
World Athletics Championships medalists
World Athletics Indoor Championships winners
European Athletics Championships medalists
Hungarian Athletics Championships winners
Competitors at the 2011 Summer Universiade
Competitors at the 2013 Summer Universiade